Nicholas Guidi (born 25 June 1983) is an Italian former football defender.

Club career
After 2 years of experience with Cuiopelli, Guidi was bought by A.S. Lucchese Libertas 1905 and he played for them for 4 years in Serie C1. In 2008, he passed to Frosinone in Serie B, following the coach Piero Braglia.
In this season he was confirmed by the current coach Francesco Moriero.

In 2009-10 season, he was an emergency right back for the team in mid-season, due to the injury of Lorenzo Del Prete. He then lost his place to Daniel Semenzato but in round 23 replaced injured Domenico Maietta as central back.

References

External links
Profile at lega-calcio.it

1983 births
Living people
People from Viareggio
Association football defenders
Italian footballers
S.S.D. Lucchese 1905 players
Frosinone Calcio players
Cosenza Calcio players
Forlì F.C. players
S.S. Arezzo players
Serie B players
Serie C players
Serie D players
Sportspeople from the Province of Lucca
Footballers from Tuscany